"Something Wicca This Way Comes" is the first episode of the television series Charmed. Written by series creator and executive producer Constance M. Burge and directed by John T. Kretchmer, it was first broadcast in the United States on The WB on October 7, 1998. "Something Wicca This Way Comes" was the highest-rated episode of Charmed in the entire series. It was watched by 7.7 million viewers and broke the record for the highest-rated premiere episode in The WB's history, being later surpassed by the pilot episode of Smallville.

The series focuses on the lives of three Halliwell sisters, known as the Charmed Ones: Prue (Shannen Doherty), Piper (Holly Marie Combs) and Phoebe Halliwell (Alyssa Milano), as they deal with their grandmother's death and learn that they inherited a little more than the house they grew up in. All three of them have inherited magic powers; Prue has the power of telekinesis, Piper has the power to freeze time, and Phoebe has the power of premonition. Together they try to live everyday normal lives in San Francisco, while battling demons and warlocks, and keeping their supernatural identities a secret.

The name of this episode is a play on words from Shakespeare's Macbeth: "By the pricking of my thumbs, something wicked this way comes."

Plot
In San Francisco, witch Serena Fredrick (Lonnie Partridge) is murdered in her apartment by an unidentified man. Homicide Inspectors Darryl Morris (Dorian Gregory) and Andy Trudeau (T.W. King) investigate her murder. Andy tells Darryl that he suspects that witchcraft is involved, but Darryl dismisses the idea.

Piper (Holly Marie Combs) arrives late at Halliwell Manor, which she and her sisters Prue (Shannen Doherty) and Phoebe (Alyssa Milano) inherited from their recently deceased grandmother. Prue states that Piper's boyfriend Jeremy (Eric Scott Woods) has sent some flowers and a bottle of Port, the ingredient she needs for her showpiece recipe in the morning. Piper sees an old spirit board that Prue found in the basement while she was looking for a circuit tester. She turns it over to see the inscription on the back: "To my three beautiful girls, may this give you the light to find the shadows the power of three will set you free. Love, Mom."

The pair then begin to wonder about Phoebe, who is living in New York. Prue suggests that they should rent out the spare room at a reduced rate in exchange for fixing things around the house. Piper suggests that Phoebe could move in before admitting that two weeks earlier she had agreed to allow their unemployed, penniless sister to move back in. Prue is not happy with this since she and Phoebe had fallen out over Prue's former fiancé, Roger (Matthew Ashford). Months earlier, Prue had broken off the engagement because she believes he and Phoebe slept together.

After a tense reunion with Prue, Phoebe joins Piper in playing with the spirit board. As Piper goes into the kitchen, the pointer on the spirit board starts to spell a word. Frightened, Phoebe tries to convince her sisters that the pointer is moving, but they do not believe her. Piper then sees the pointer move briefly and then the spirit board finally spells out the word "attic" as Phoebe writes it down. As the storm continues, the power goes out. Piper and Prue head off to the fuse panel, but Phoebe follows the spirit board's prompt and heads to the attic. The door opens and Phoebe is guided to a wooden chest, in which she discovers a large, ancient book called the Book of Shadows. Overcome with curiosity, she reads a page aloud, which mentions the "power of three" having the active powers of an ancestor named Melinda Warren. The spell bestows Phoebe with premonitions, Piper with molecular immobilization, and Prue with telekinesis. 

Prue tells Phoebe that the book is witchcraft, but they do not believe it. In the morning Prue is confronted by Roger, who is also her boss. He removes her from the project that she had been looking after. Prue quits her job, but her anger unwittingly causes her to make his pen explode and his necktie to nearly strangle him. Piper runs out of time and can't complete her dish until she accidentally freezes the chef of the restaurant, which allows her to finish the sauce and get the job. Whilst Phoebe is riding her bike, she sees a premonition of two boys on roller skates getting hit by a car, but she saves them by crashing her bike into the car.

Prue sees her power in action for the first time when putting cream in her drink. While Prue is in a pharmacy looking for aspirin, Phoebe observes that Prue uses her power when she is angry. Phoebe winds her sister up over Roger and their father, which causes Prue to knock most of the stock off the shelves. Meanwhile, Piper is on a date with Jeremy, who is actually a warlock who steals the powers of good witches. Jeremy says that he has always known that Piper and her sisters are witches, which is why he started dating Piper six months earlier. He then shows Piper Serena's powers, revealing himself as her murderer. While Jeremy attempts to stab Piper with an athame, she freezes him and escapes before telling Prue and Phoebe what happened. The trio then create a potion which injures Jeremy, and Phoebe has a premonition that he has been wounded but not defeated. After trying to blockade themselves from Jeremy, Prue remembers the inscription on the spirit board and begin chanting, "The power of three will set us free", which destroys Jeremy.

Production
An unaired pilot for the series was first shot, with some scenes filmed in the actual manor that is shown on the show, located at 1329 Carroll Avenue in Los Angeles. Lori Rom and Chris Boyd were originally cast to play Phoebe and Andy, and were later recast. After Lori Rom leaving Charmed, executive producer Aaron Spelling asked Alyssa Milano, whom he knew from Melrose Place, to be her replacement and the show moved to a sound studio.

The unaired pilot is featured in a bonus disc of some editions of the complete series DVD releases.

Reception
In 2016, Gavin Hetherington of SpoilerTV ran a series of Charmed articles in the run-up to the 10th anniversary of the series finale. The first was a complete season review of season one, including the pilot episode, in which Gavin comments that the episode is a "classic", and that he "loved the episode".

External links

References

1998 American television episodes
Charmed (TV series) episodes
American television series premieres

fr:Le Livre des ombres
sv:Lista över avsnitt av Förhäxad#Säsong 1